Carabus versicolor, is a species of ground beetle in the large genus Carabus.

References 

versicolor
Insects described in 1835